HM Prison Rochester (formerly known as Borstal Prison) is a male Young Offenders Institution, founded in 1874, and located in the Borstal area of Rochester in Kent, England. The prison is operated by His Majesty's Prison Service, and is located next to HMP Cookham Wood.

History

19th Century
HMP Rochester was founded in 1874 as Borstal Prison, which was a large convict prison.  Borstal Prison was then an experimental juvenile prison of the reformatory type set up in 1902. Because it was the first detention centre of its kind in the UK, the word "Borstal" became synonymous with other detention centres for youths across the country, and elsewhere.

20th Century
The institution remained as a Borstal school until 1983, when it was converted into a Youth Custody Centre and renamed 'Rochester'. 

In 1988, the prison changed its role to operate as a remand centre for the Kent courts and sentenced category C and D adult males. Rochester then became a mixed site prison for immigration detainees and a resettlement unit for adult male prisoners. The prison also operated as a remand and allocation centre for males under the age of 21.

21st Century
In January 2002, Rochester re-rolled to a prison solely for sentenced young men up to the age of 21. 

In March 2003, Rochester Prison was criticised by its own Board of Visitors. The Board stated that there were few useful employment or educational opportunities for inmates, and so therefore they had few chances to gain qualifications or work experience.

In August 2006, an inspection report from His Majesty's Chief Inspector of Prisons declared that Rochester Prison was improving, but still had a number of unresolved issues. Inspectors found that HMP Rochester was generally safe, and had good staff-prisoner relations. However the prison was called on to do more to provide work for inmates, and to do more to combat bullying.  

In March 2007, it was announced that the capacity of Rochester Prison was to be doubled to 700. This drew severe opposition from local residents. Construction had briefly begun in March 2007, but was on hold pending permission from Medway council, the local planning authority. This was granted, and in September 2008 a further four accommodation units were constructed at the site.

The prison today
Rochester holds convicted, sentenced adults serving less than four years. Accommodation at the prison comprises a mixture of single- and double-accommodation cells.

The prison offers offending behaviour courses, education, drug rehabilitation, NVQ-based work placements, weekend and evening association with access to gym- and sports-related activities. Various chapel-based courses are also available to inmates.

Notable former inmates
 Michael Boateng, former professional footballer jailed for  conspiracy to defraud as part of an investigation into match-fixing. Boateng has co-presented on a podcast called Banged Up talking about his time in Rochester.

References

External links
GOV.UK page on Rochester Prison

Young Offender Institutions in England
Prisons in Kent
1874 establishments in England